The Leverett Circle Connector Bridge is a highway bridge over the Charles River, carrying two lanes each of northbound and southbound traffic. It connects to Interstate 93 (I-93) in Somerville, Massachusetts (Northern Expressway) at the northern end (exit 18, formerly 26 from I-93 south) and splits at the southern end, providing direct access to both Storrow Drive and Leverett Circle in Boston.  Going northbound, there is also a fork which provides access to the City Square Tunnel under Charlestown to proceed on U.S. Route 1 (US 1) northbound via the Tobin Bridge.

The span was built in conjunction with the more dramatic Leonard P. Zakim Bunker Hill Bridge as part of the Central Artery/Tunnel Project, widely known as the Big Dig. During construction, the Leverett Circle Connector Bridge was sometimes called "Baby Bridge".  The bridge opened for traffic on October 7, 1999, at a cost of $22.27 million (equivalent to $ in ).

Also known as the Storrow Drive Connector, it is the largest steel box girder bridge in the United States. It was the winner of a July 2001 National Steel Bridge Alliance (NSBA) "prize bridge" award. Its weaving design was determined by the other major structures involved in the Big Dig but unlike other parts of the project, it was finished eight days ahead of schedule.

Major intersections
The entire route is in Boston, Suffolk County.

Gallery

See also

References

Bridges in Boston
West End, Boston
Buildings and structures in Somerville, Massachusetts
Bridges in Middlesex County, Massachusetts
Road bridges in Massachusetts
Transportation in Somerville, Massachusetts
Bridges over the Charles River
Bridges completed in 1999
1999 establishments in Massachusetts
Steel bridges in the United States
Box girder bridges in the United States